The 2023 Challenger de Tigre was a professional tennis tournament played on clay courts. It was the third edition of the tournament which was part of the 2023 ATP Challenger Tour. It took place in Tigre, Argentina between 2 and 8 January 2023.

Singles main-draw entrants

Seeds

 1 Rankings are as of 26 December 2022.

Other entrants
The following players received wildcards into the singles main draw:
  Luciano Emanuel Ambrogi
  Guido Andreozzi
  Lautaro Midón

The following players received entry from the qualifying draw:
  Valerio Aboian
  Alex Barrena
  Matías Franco Descotte
  Juan Pablo Paz
  Carlos Sánchez Jover
  Thiago Seyboth Wild

Champions

Singles

  Juan Manuel Cerúndolo def.  Murkel Dellien 4–6, 6–4, 6–2.

Doubles

  Guido Andreozzi /  Ignacio Carou def.  Leonardo Aboian /  Ignacio Monzón 5–7, 6–4, [10–5].

References

2023 ATP Challenger Tour
2023 in Argentine tennis
January 2023 sports events in Argentina